Minuscule 351 (in the Gregory-Aland numbering), ε 228 (Soden), is a Greek minuscule manuscript of the New Testament, on parchment. Paleographically it has been assigned to the 12th century. 
It has marginalia.

Description 

The codex contains a complete text of the four Gospels on 268 parchment leaves with only one lacuna (John 21:9-25). It is written in one column per page, in 22 lines per page.

The text is divided according to the Ammonian Sections (Mark 233 Sections, the last section in 16:8), whose numbers are given at the margin, wit references to the Eusebian Canons (written below Ammonian Section numbers).

In the 15th century in many places of the codex was inserted a Latin version between lines of the Greek text.

Text 

The Greek text of the codex is a representative of the Byzantine text-type. Hermann von Soden classified it to the textual family Family Kx. Aland placed it in Category V.
According to the Claremont Profile Method it represents the textual family Kx in Luke 1.

History 

The manuscript was added to the list of New Testament manuscripts by Scholz (1794-1852).
It was examined by Dean Burgon. C. R. Gregory saw it in 1886.

The manuscript is currently housed at the Biblioteca Ambrosiana (B. 70 sup.) in Milan.

See also 

 List of New Testament minuscules
 Biblical manuscript
 Textual criticism

References

Further reading 

 J. M. A. Scholz, Biblisch-kritische Reise (Leipzig, 1823), p. 70-73.
 Catalogus graecorum Bibliothecace Ambrosianae (Mediolani 1906), vol. I, pp. 114.

Greek New Testament minuscules
12th-century biblical manuscripts
Vulgate manuscripts
Manuscripts of the Ambrosiana collections